West Falmouth is a census-designated place (CDP) in the town of Falmouth in Barnstable County, Massachusetts, United States. The population was 1,738 at the 2010 census.

West Falmouth Village Historic District is at the heart of West Falmouth Village. Historic buildings include the West Falmouth Library, Quaker Meeting House and Quaker Carriage Sheds, Emerson House, the West Falmouth Fire Station, and numerous historic houses. Other nearby attractions include the Shining Sea Bikeway, the public beach at Chapoquoit Beach, West Falmouth Harbor, Bourne Farm, Great Sippewissett Marsh, Swift Playground on Blacksmith Shop Road, and the Mock Moraine conservation area. There are several restaurants, markets, inns, real estate agents, and shops in West Falmouth, as well as a post office.

Geography
West Falmouth is located in the west-central part of the town of Falmouth at  (41.599628, -70.637812). It is bordered to the north by North Falmouth, to the east by Massachusetts Route 28, to the south by Little Sippewisset Marsh, and to the west by Buzzards Bay.

Demographics

As of the census of 2000, there were 1,867 people, 835 households, and 558 families residing in the CDP. The population density was 228.1/km (590.8/mi). There were 1,278 housing units at an average density of 156.2/km (404.4/mi). The racial makeup of the CDP was 97.86% White, 0.43% African American, 0.05% Native American, 0.70% Asian, 0.32% from other races, and 0.64% from two or more races. Hispanic or Latino of any race were 0.86% of the population.

There were 835 households, out of which 19.6% had children under the age of 18 living with them, 58.9% were married couples living together, 7.1% had a female householder with no husband present, and 33.1% were non-families. 27.9% of all households were made up of individuals, and 12.5% had someone living alone who was 65 years of age or older. The average household size was 2.21 and the average family size was 2.66.

In the CDP, the population was spread out, with 17.5% under the age of 18, 3.6% from 18 to 24, 20.3% from 25 to 44, 34.2% from 45 to 64, and 24.4% who were 65 years of age or older. The median age was 50 years. For every 100 females, there were 88.4 males. For every 100 females age 18 and over, there were 84.6 males.

The median income for a household in the CDP was $72,703, and the median income for a family was $84,368. Males had a median income of $56,250 versus $42,250 for females. The per capita income for the CDP was $42,159. None of the families and 2.1% of the population were living below the poverty line, including no under eighteens and none of those over 64.

Arts and entertainment 
Since 1975, West Falmouth has been the home of The College Light Opera Company, a not-for-profit educational summer stock theatre company which resides at  Bridgefields Hall.

References

External links
 West Falmouth Library

Census-designated places in Barnstable County, Massachusetts
Census-designated places in Massachusetts
Falmouth, Massachusetts
Populated coastal places in Massachusetts